The red-crowned barbet (Psilopogon rafflesii) is a species of bird in the family Megalaimidae. It is found in Brunei, Indonesia, Malaysia, Myanmar, Singapore, and Thailand. Its natural habitats are subtropical or tropical moist lowland forests and plantations. It is threatened by habitat loss.

Description 
The red-crowned barbet is medium-large, at 24.5–27 cm (9.6–10.6 in) in length and 99–150 grams (3.5–5.3 ounces) in weight. It is primarily green, with a red crown and spots below the eyes, black and yellow face, and a blue throat and eyebrow. Females resemble males, but are duller.

Feeding habits 
The prey of red-crowned barbet include land snails of the genus Amphidromus.

References

red-crowned barbet
Birds of Malesia
red-crowned barbet
Taxonomy articles created by Polbot